Mielno  is a village in the administrative district of Gmina Gubin, within Krosno Odrzańskie County, Lubusz Voivodeship, in western Poland, close to the German border.

The village has an approximate population of 100.

References

Villages in Krosno Odrzańskie County